Alex Shaffer may refer to:

 Alex Shaffer (actor)
 Alex Shaffer (alpine skier)